Eustace White (1559 - 1591) was a Catholic priest. Due to his service he was put on trial in December 1591 and subsequently hanged, drawn and quartered at Tyburn on 10 December 1591, along with another priest and three laymen. He is one of the Forty Martyrs of England and Wales and has been canonised by Pope Paul VI in 1970.

Life 
Born in Louth, Lincolnshire, in 1559, he converted to the Roman Catholic Church in 1584 and was disowned by his father. He travelled to Europe to study for the priesthood and was ordained, probably at the Venerable English College, Rome, in 1588. He returned to England for his ministry later that year - the year of the Spanish Armada. He thus began his ministry just as anti-Catholic feeling was reaching fever pitch.

Martyrdom 
A conversation with a fellow traveller led to his arrest in Dorset three years later in 1591. White put up a very articulate defence in the West Country, but was subsequently sent to London and imprisoned in Bridewell Prison.  In October 1591 the Privy Council authorised the use of torture on White.  

A letter from him still survives, written a few weeks before his execution, and is addressed to Father Henry Garnet from prison, 23 November 1591:

He was put on trial in December 1591 and subsequently hanged, drawn and quartered at Tyburn on 10 December 1591, along with another priest and three laymen.

Before being executed, he forgave Topcliffe his cruelties, and prayed for him, and at his execution, telling the people that his only treason was his priesthood, and thanked God for the happy crown to his labors. Being cut down alive, he rose to his feet, but was tripped up and dragged to the fire where two men stood upon his arms while the executioner butchered him.

Veneration 
There is a stained glass window of Saint Eustace White in St. Mary's Catholic Church in Louth, where the martyr was born.

A book entitled Saint Eustace White: Elizabethan Priest and Martyr was written by Mark Vickers.

References

External links
Book review: St Eustace White, Elizabethan Priest and Martyr

1559 births
1591 deaths
People from Louth, Lincolnshire
Catholic saints who converted from Protestantism
Forty Martyrs of England and Wales
English saints
English College, Rome alumni
Converts to Roman Catholicism from Anglicanism
English Roman Catholic saints
16th-century English Roman Catholic priests
People executed under Elizabeth I by hanging, drawing and quartering
Executed people from Lincolnshire
16th-century Christian saints